Pacific Mercantile Bancorp was a bank holding company based in Costa Mesa, California.

History
In March 1999, the bank opened its first branch. 

In September 2003, the bank opened a branch in La Habra, California.

In 2000, the company became a public company via an initial public offering.

In October 2004, the bank opened a branch in Long Beach, California.

In 2005, the company exited the wholesale mortgage business.

In April 2013, Raymond E. Dellerba, the founding chairman and chief executive officer, retired.

In June 2016, the company was added to the Russell 3000 Index.

In October 2021, the company was acquired by Banc of California and delisted from the Nasdaq.

References

External links

Banks based in California
Companies formerly listed on the Nasdaq